The haka is a traditional Māori dance form. The use of haka in popular culture is a growing phenomenon, originally from New Zealand. Traditionally, haka were used only in Māori cultural contexts, but today haka are used in a wide range of occasions.

Sports

New Zealand sports teams 

For over 100 years the All Blacks have had a tradition of performing a haka before games. This has become the most widely known use of the haka, but several other New Zealand sports teams now perform the haka before commencing a game. These include rugby league (the Kiwis), basketball (Tall Blacks), and wheelchair rugby (Wheel Blacks). 

In addition to this planned, formalised usage, teams and supporters now often perform impromptu haka as a celebration or encouragement. At the Sydney Olympics in 2000 these uses of the haka were numerous enough to draw some negative comment.

Use by non-New Zealand sports teams 

A number of sports teams outside of New Zealand have adopted the haka, most notably the American football teams of Brigham Young University, University of Hawaii and Trinity High School in Euless, Texas as well as the Highland Rugby Team. Both the Coventry Jets and the London Olympians, British American Football teams, have, on occasions, performed the haka before their games. Both squads have had a large number of Polynesian players over the past 5 years.

Military
The haka is performed by members of the New Zealand Defence Force as a show of solidarity such as during funerals of fallen comrades. All three services have their own haka. The New Zealand Army has a haka composed specifically for them called Tu Taua a Tumatauenga.

Other
The music video for the Pātea Māori Club's song Poi E in 1983 (written by Dalvanius Prime and Ngoi Pēwhairangi) used a mixture of kapa haka and hip-hop choreography. This song was number one on New Zealand music charts for four weeks in 1984. Poi E was then choreographed by Dolina Wehipeihana as the outro song parody for Taika Waititi's movie Boy (2010) referencing Michael Jackson's Thriller music video.

There was a craze in 2011 in the lead up to the Rugby World Cup where flashmob hakas became a popular way of expressing support for the All Blacks. Some Maori leaders thought it was "inappropriate" and a "bastardisation" of the traditional war cry, despite its popularity. Sizeable flashmob hakas were performed in Wellington and Auckland, as well as London, which has a large Kiwi expat community.

In November 2012, a Maori kapa haka group from Rotorua performed a version of the "Gangnam Style" dance mixed with a traditional Maori haka in Seoul, celebrating 50 years of diplomatic relations between South Korea and New Zealand.

In 2020, Māori actors Rob Kipa-Williams, Ethan Browne, and Kawakawa Fox-Reo performed a haka in the Australian soap opera Home and Away, a first for the serial.

See also
 Cibi
 Kapa haka
 Kailao
 Māori music
 Siva Tau

References

Popular culture, Haka in
Topics in popular culture